Żurawin  is a village in east-central Poland, in the administrative district of Gmina Mochowo, within Sierpc County, Masovian Voivodeship.

References

Villages in Sierpc County